Jonathan Ericsson (born 2 March 1984) is a Swedish professional ice hockey defenceman who is currently an unrestricted free agent. He most recently played for the Detroit Red Wings of the National Hockey League (NHL). Ericsson was drafted in the ninth round, 291st overall, in the 2002 NHL Entry Draft, the final pick of the draft. He has played his entire NHL career with the Red Wings organization.

Playing career
Ericsson originally began his playing career as a centre, playing all but one game of the 2001–02 season at the position for HC Vita Hästen's junior team. However, after playing one game as a defenceman, Detroit Red Wings scout Håkan Andersson convinced Ericsson to permanently transition to defence.

Ericsson was drafted 291st overall in the ninth round of the 2002 NHL Entry Draft as the last player selected in the draft by Detroit.

Throughout his next four seasons, Ericsson played for several teams in his native Sweden, a period of time which also saw him switching between centre and defence as his teams saw fit. After his 2005–06 season, Detroit signed him to a two-year, entry-level contract and brought him to the United States to play for their American Hockey League (AHL) affiliate, the Grand Rapids Griffins.

Ericsson then played his first career NHL game on 22 February 2008, against the Calgary Flames, and scored his first career NHL goal the following game, on 26 February, against Edmonton Oilers goaltender Mathieu Garon. Although he did not qualify under NHL rules to have his name engraved on the Stanley Cup, Ericsson was nonetheless included on the 2008 Detroit Red Wings' Stanley Cup-winning team photograph, also being awarded a Stanley Cup ring for his efforts with the team. During the 2008–09 regular season, he recorded one goal and three assists. On 16 April 2009, Ericsson played in his first Stanley Cup playoff game with the Red Wings, in Game 1 of the first round of the 2009 playoffs against the Columbus Blue Jackets. He recorded his first career playoff point in this game, a goal.

In Game 1 of the second round of the 2009 playoffs, against the Anaheim Ducks, Ericsson recorded two assists and also fought Ducks winger Corey Perry. Ericsson would then score a goal and an assist in Detroit's Western Conference Final matchup with the team's division rival, the Chicago Blackhawks, and recorded two goals with an assist in the Stanley Cup Finals against the Pittsburgh Penguins. Ericsson scored Detroit's only goal in Game 7 of their 2–1 loss to Pittsburgh. At the end of the season, he won the 2009 Detroit Sports Broadcasters Association (DSBA)-Detroit Red Wings Rookie of the Year Award.

In 2008, Ericsson signed a three-year contract extension with the Detroit Red Wings carrying an annual average of $2.7 million. In 2009–10 season, Ericsson scored four goals and nine assists for 13 points in 62 games. In 2011, he signed a three-year $9.75 million contract with the Red Wings.

On 27 November 2013, Ericsson signed a six-year, $25.5 million contract extension with the Red Wings.

During the 2016–17 season, Ericsson suffered a season-ending wrist injury in February, limiting him to 51 games in which he contributed 9 points.

On 23 October 2019, Ericsson was assigned to the Grand Rapids Griffins of the AHL. During the 2019–20 season, he recorded two assists in 10 games for the Griffins. He was recalled by the Red Wings on 13 November.

International play

Ericsson's older brother, Jimmie Ericsson, is a forward currently playing for Skellefteå AIK in the Swedish Hockey League. The Ericsson brothers were set to play together professionally for the first time at the 2010 World Championships. Following Detroit's elimination in the 2010 playoffs, Jonathan joined Sweden's national team at the World Championships. The brothers were originally in the lineup together, though Jimmie injured his knee on his first shift, missing the remainder of the tournament; the two were never on the ice together. In the tournament, Jonathan Ericcson finished the tournament with the most average minutes per game amongst Swedish skaters, and was also selected as one of the best players on the team as selected by the coach. The brothers eventually played together for the first time at the 2014 Winter Olympics in Sochi, where they won a silver medal after losing to Canada in the tournament final.

Personal life
Ericsson married long-time girlfriend Evelina Hedman in July 2014. In October 2013, Evelina gave birth to a daughter, Liv. She was named in memory of Ericsson's friend and former teammate Stefan Liv.

Career statistics

Regular season and playoffs

International

Awards
 Named to the PlanetUSA AHL All-Star Team in 2008.
 Named as Detroit Red Wings' "Rookie of the Year" by the Detroit Sports Broadcasters Association in 2009.

See also
List of Olympic medalist families

References

External links
 
Red Wings Central prospects – Jonathan Ericsson

1984 births
Living people
Almtuna IS players
Detroit Red Wings draft picks
Detroit Red Wings players
Grand Rapids Griffins players
Huddinge IK players
Ice hockey players at the 2014 Winter Olympics
Medalists at the 2014 Winter Olympics
Olympic ice hockey players of Sweden
Olympic medalists in ice hockey
Olympic silver medalists for Sweden
People from Karlskrona
Södertälje SK players
Swedish expatriate ice hockey players in the United States
Swedish ice hockey defencemen
Sportspeople from Blekinge County